Hangman's Daughter may refer to:
 The Hangman's Daughter, a novel by Oliver Pötzsch
 Hangman's Daughter, a former subsidiary of Hangman Records
The Hangman's Beautiful Daughter, album by The Incredible String Band 
From Dusk Till Dawn 3: The Hangman's Daughter, 2000 horror film